Ram Saran represents Sninagar vidhansabha of Lakhimpur as member of the legislative assembly. He is an Indian politician and Member of the Samajwadi Party.

Early life 

Saran was born on 2 April 1963 in a middle-class family at Lakhimpur, Uttar Pradesh. His father Nangaram was a onetime Member of Legislative Uttar Pradesh. Saran did his basic education from government primary schools and graduated from KKC KKC, Lucknow.

References

1963 births
Living people